"You'll Be Fine" is a single by Canadian rock band Palaye Royale. The single was released on July 18, 2019 through Sumerian Records. The song is the lead single off of the band's second studio album, Boom Boom Room (Side B).

Music video 
A corresponding music video to the single was also released on July 19, 2018. The music video, directed by Frankie Nasso, shows the band playing to a group of mannqueins in a small room before alternating scenes between the band driving a convertible in the desert. Miryam Rabinowitz produced the music video, Alexander Lamburini lead photography, Steven Contreras edited the video, and additional footage was provided by Michael Bolten.

The music video was shot in one day.

Charts 
"You'll Be Fine" was the first single by the band to chart, reaching number 22 on the Billboard Mainstream Rock chart in the United States.

References 

2018 singles
2018 songs
Palaye Royale songs
Sumerian Records singles